Bisei may refer to:

 Bisei, Okayama, a former town located in Oda District, Okayama Prefecture, Japan
 Bisei Spaceguard Center in Bisei, Okayama
 17286 Bisei, a minor planet
 Bisei Asteroid Tracking Telescope for Rapid Survey, a Japanese project to find asteroids